Coulthard is an English surname. Notable people with the surname include:
Alan George Weall Coulthard (1924–1988), British judge, broadcaster, writer and politician
 Alice Coulthard (born 1983), English actress
Bill Coulthard (1923–2005), Canadian basketball player
Billy Coulthard (fl. 1932–1937), English footballer 
 Colin Coulthard (1921–2004), British officer in the Royal Air Force
David Coulthard (born 1971), Scottish racing driver
Fabian Coulthard (born 1982), New Zealand racing driver
George Coulthard (1856–1883), Australian rules footballer
James Coulthard (born 1868), British rugby player, trade unionist and politician
Jean Coulthard (1908–2000), Canadian composer
 Philippa Coulthard (born 1992), Australian television actress
Ray Coulthard (born 1968), English actor
Sean Coulthard (1968), American professional wrestling commentator whose ring name is Michael Cole
Terrence Coulthard, Aboriginal Australian tourism operator of Iga Warta, at Nepabunna in the Flinders Ranges of South Australia
Vince Coulthard, Aboriginal Australian traditional owner, involved in the World Heritage Site nomination of the Flinders Ranges in South Australia
Belinda Noonan, née Coulthard (born 1957), Australian former competitive figure skater 
Faith Thomas, née Coulthard (born 1933), Australian former cricketer and hockey player

See also
Gillian Coultard (born 1963), English former football player
John Coulthard And Son, consisting of John and Ralph Coulthard
Mount Coulthard, Canada

See also 
 Dewhurst v. Coulthard, a 1799 United States Supreme Court case
John Coulthard and Son, later R. Coulthard and Company, a locomotive manufacturer later still known as Black, Hawthorn & Co
 

English-language surnames